The 1968–69 season is Real Madrid Club de Fútbol's 66th season in existence and the club's 37th consecutive season in the top flight of Spanish football.

Summary 
The club won its 14th League title ever and second Three-peat ever. included a record of nine streak wins on its first nine rounds the team clinched the trophy nine points above runners-up UD Las Palmas. The squad was defeated only one single time in 38 rounds by Elche CF. Also, Amancio won the Pichichi Trophy with 14 goals scored tied along José Eulogio Gárate from Atlético Madrid.

Shockingly, in European Cup the team was early eliminated in Eightfinals by Austrian side Rapid Wien which won 1:0 the first leg in Wien and advanced to Quarterfinals due to away goals after lost 1:2 in Madrid. During June in Copa del Generalísimo the club lost the Eightfinals series against Atlético Madrid.

The "Ye-yé" era started to collapse for this campaign three members Araquistáin, Serena and Pachín were transferred out.

Squad

Transfers

Competitions

La Liga

Position by round

League table

Matches

Copa del Generalísimo

Eightfinals

European Cup

Preliminary round

Eightfinals

Statistics

Players statistics

See also 
 Yé-yé (Real Madrid)

References

External links 
 BDFútbol

Real Madrid CF seasons
Spanish football championship-winning seasons
Real Madrid